If Looks Could Kill may refer to:

Film and television
If Looks Could Kill (film), a 1991 action comedy spy film
If Looks Could Kill (1996 film), a 1996 television movie starring David Keith; see List of films based on television programs
"If Looks Could Kill", a 1993 episode of the Canadian TV series Forever Knight
"If Looks Could Kill", a 2006 episode of the American TV series CSI: Miami

Music
, a 1982 single from the 1981 album Spies Of Life by Player
"If Looks Could Kill" (Heart song), a 1986 single from the 1985 album Heart
"If Looks Could Kill" (Rodney Crowell song), a 1990 single from the 1989 album Keys to the Highway
"If Looks Could Kill" (Transvision Vamp song), a 1991 single from the album Little Magnets Versus the Bubble of Babble
"If Looks Could Kill", a 2007 single from the 2006 album Let's Get Out of This Country by Camera Obscura
"If Looks Could Kill" (Timomatic song), a 2012 single from the album Timomatic
"If Looks Could Kill" (Destroy Lonely song), a 2023 single from the album If Looks Could Kill
If Looks Could Kill, I'd Watch You Die, a 1999 album by Death By Stereo
 If Looks Could Kill (album)